Man on the Moon is a children's book by Simon Bartram, published in 2002. It was chosen as the Blue Peter Book of the Year after it was reprinted in paperback in 2004.

References

2002 books
Fiction set on the Moon